Maksim Valeryevich Filippov (born 15 February 1984) is a former Russian professional football player.

External links
 

1984 births
People from Magnitogorsk
Living people
Russian footballers
Association football forwards
FC Amkar Perm players
FC Tekstilshchik Ivanovo players
FC Mordovia Saransk players
FC Fakel Voronezh players
FC Orenburg players
Russian Premier League players
FC Novokuznetsk players
Sportspeople from Chelyabinsk Oblast
FC Chita players